Talkh Ab-e Ahmadzadeh (also Romanized as Talkh Āb-e Aḩmadzādeh; also known as Talkh Āb-e Mīr ‘Alī Bakesh) is a village in Babuyi Rural District, Basht District, Basht County, Kohgiluyeh and Boyer-Ahmad Province, Iran. At the 2006 census, its population was 39, in 9 families.

References 

Populated places in Basht County